The Nevada State Treasurer is an independent constitutional officer in the executive branch of government of the U.S. state of Nevada. The State Treasurer's Office is based in Carson City, Nevada. Twenty-three individuals have occupied the office of treasurer since statehood. The incumbent is Zach Conine, a Democrat. He was first elected in the 2018 Nevada elections and is currently serving his second term in office.

Election and term of office
The state treasurer is elected to a four-year term and may serve for eight years or two terms under Nevada's constitutionally mandated term limits.

Powers and duties
The state treasurer is the chief banker and investment officer for state government. As such, the State Treasurer's Office manages the state's cash flows and investments, issues and services the state debt, and administers Nevada's unclaimed property laws. The State Treasurer's Office also facilitates tax-advantaged savings programs for future college students and individuals with disabilities.

In addition to functional responsibilities, the state treasurer chairs the Board of Finance and is a member of the Executive Branch Audit Committee. The former authorizes the issuance of debt and establishes investment policies for the state's investment portfolio. The latter oversees the state's internal audit function.

List of State Treasurers

References

External links 

Nevada Election Results 1962-present

Treasurer